Roland Vincent Massimino (November 13, 1934 – August 30, 2017) was an American basketball coach. He served as the head men's basketball coach at Stony Brook University (1969–1971), Villanova University (1973–1992), the University of Nevada, Las Vegas (1992–1994), Cleveland State University (1996–2003), and at Northwood University's Florida campus, which was sold in 2014 to Keiser University (2006–2017). He reached the Elite Eight of the NCAA Tournament five times (all with Villanova) and reached the NAIA Seminfinal twice. 

At Villanova, he led his 1984–85 team to the NCAA championship. Entering the 1985 NCAA tournament as an eight seed, Villanova defeated their heavily favored Big East Conference foe, the Georgetown Hoyas, in the title game. It is widely regarded as one of the greatest upsets in NCAA history.

Education
Roland Massimino graduated in 1952 from Hillside High School in Hillside, New Jersey. In 1956, he earned a bachelor's degree in education from the University of Vermont (UVM), where he played varsity basketball for three years. He earned a master's degree equivalent in health and physical education from Rutgers University in 1959. While he was a student at UVM, he became a member of the Alpha-Lambda chapter of the Kappa Sigma fraternity.

Coaching career

High school
After graduating from UVM, Massimino entered the coaching ranks, where he coached varsity baseball and freshman and JV basketball at Cranford High School in Cranford, New Jersey. In 1959, he began a four-year tenure as head varsity basketball coach at Hillside High School in Hillside, New Jersey, the town in which he had grown up.  In his second year as head basketball coach at Hillside, he led his team to the finals of the State Group III Championship. They lost a tightly contested final game to Burlington High School from Burlington, New Jersey. The Hillside team was led by Frank Checorski, a unanimous Top-Five All-State Selection throughout The Garden State.

In 1963, with the support of high school All-American Bill Schutsky—who later captained the Army Cadets basketball team—Massimino led the Comets to the state Group IV finals. In both seasons, Hillside was defeated in the final playoff game by Newark's Central High School. The Comets lost during both years to a team composed of taller players, despite pushing the thrilling 1963 championship game into double-overtime.

For the 1963–64 season, Massimino moved to Lexington High School in Massachusetts. In 1965, he led the Lexington squad to a state championship and later led another to a 20–1 record. Along the way, Massimino was laying the foundation for an elite scholastic program which later dominated the Middlesex League, winning state titles in 1971, 1972, and 1978 along with league championships in 16 of the past 30 years.

In ten seasons as a high school coach, Massimino compiled a 160–61 record.

College
Massimino's collegiate debut came in 1969 as head coach of Stony Brook University. In his first season the Patriots (now Seawolves) won the conference championship after going 19–6, earning a berth in the NCAA small college tournament. Massimino's next stop was as an assistant coach under Chuck Daly at the University of Pennsylvania.

Massimino left Penn in March 1973, succeeding Jack Kraft as head coach of Villanova and leading the 1984-85 Wildcats team to one of the greatest upsets in NCAA tournament history by knocking off top-seeded Georgetown University (Washington, D.C.) in the 1985 NCAA Tournament Championship Game. The road to the finals proved an even greater challenge, kicking off with a win on #9-seed Dayton's home court, followed by victories over #1-seed Michigan, #4-seed Maryland, #2-seed North Carolina, before culminating in a Final Four victory over #2-seeded Memphis State.

After Villanova's unexpected championship run, Massimino was offered the head coaching position of the NBA's New Jersey Nets. At the last minute, he declined the offer to stay at Villanova and devote more time to his family.

After a few subpar years, Massimino left Villanova in 1992 to assume the head coaching job at UNLV. The initial hope was that he could restore the success and credibility of the UNLV program after the basketball team's 1991–92 probation and the forced resignation of long-time coach Jerry Tarkanian. Two years later, Massimino was himself forced out when it was revealed that he and UNLV president Robert Maxson had cut a side deal to lift Massimino's salary above the figure being reported to the state of Nevada and the state commission ruled that this had violated both state ethics laws, as well as UNLV rules.

Moving on to Cleveland State University in 1996, Massimino's teams recorded a 90–113 record in his seven seasons as coach. Massimino's contract was bought out following a series of off-court issues. These included several players with drug and alcohol problems, other players arrested for serious crimes, and allegations of academic fraud.

Massimino was the head coach of the men's basketball team at Keiser University in West Palm Beach, Florida, members of the National Association of Intercollegiate Athletics (NAIA). Massimino continued his role as coach when Northwood University sold its Florida campus to Keiser University. The 2005-06 Northwood team coached by Massimino was its inaugural season in The Sun Conference. In his first four seasons with the Seahawks, Massimino led Northwood to four FSC regular-season titles, four appearances in the NAIA National tournament, and the Seahawks reached the Elite Eight in 2008. Massimino and the Seahawks received bids to the NAIA tournament in all of his eight seasons at Northwood, and once as Keiser, with the team's best finishes a place in the national semifinals in 2011 and a national runner-up finish in 2012. Massimino's overall record at Northwood/Keiser stands at 298–75 ( winning percentage).

On November 1, 2012, Massimino returned to Rupp Arena in Lexington, Kentucky for the first time since his 1985 championship triumph, playing a preseason exhibition game against reigning NCAA Division I champions Kentucky. The game was played at the request of Massimino after indicating to Kentucky head coach John Calipari that the 2012–13 season could be his last in coaching. In a later interview, Massimino hedged somewhat, saying, "I don't know if it's my last [season]. I hope I can go another year or so." Kentucky introduced Massimino with a video montage of the final minutes of Villanova's 1985 victory.

On December 14, 2016, Massimino, at 82 years old, reached coaching win number 800 when Keiser University defeated Trinity Baptist 77–47.

Fox Sports released a 2018 television documentary titled The Maestro: The Rollie Massimino Story, written and directed by Bill Raftery, which chronicles Massimino's final season (2016–17) coaching Keiser University. Massimino coached the season, against his doctors' recommendation, while battling terminal cancer.

Death
Massimino was diagnosed with terminal lung cancer and brain cancer in April 2016 and given one year to live. Coincidentally, he was at NRG Stadium in Houston in April 2016 to see Villanova win the NCAA tournament. Massimino died sixteen months later on August 30, 2017. To honor Massimino's memory, Villanova wore throwback uniforms throughout 2017–18 in the style of those the Wildcats did during their 1984–85 championship season.

Head coaching record

See also
 List of college men's basketball coaches with 600 wins
 List of NCAA Division I Men's Final Four appearances by coach

References

External links
 Northwood profile
 Cleveland State profile

1934 births
2017 deaths
American men's basketball players
American people of Italian descent
Basketball coaches from New Jersey
Basketball players from New Jersey
Cleveland State Vikings men's basketball coaches
College men's basketball head coaches in the United States
Deaths from lung cancer in Florida
Hillside High School (New Jersey) alumni
High school basketball coaches in the United States
National Collegiate Basketball Hall of Fame inductees
Northwood Seahawks men's basketball coaches
Penn Quakers men's basketball coaches
People from Hillside, New Jersey
Rutgers University alumni
Sportspeople from Union County, New Jersey
Stony Brook Seawolves men's basketball coaches
UNLV Runnin' Rebels basketball coaches
Vermont Catamounts men's basketball players
Villanova Wildcats men's basketball coaches